Alexander Molony (born September 12, 2006) is an English actor. He has made his film debut as Peter Pan in the Disney film Peter Pan & Wendy.

Career
He was previously cast as the lead in children's animation Claude, on Disney Junior. He is also known for playing the son of comedian Romesh Ranganathan in the Sky sitcom The Reluctant Landlord, Ooo-Ooo the Monkey in Raa Raa the Noisy Lion and Alex the Chick in The Big Bad Fox and Other Tales. He also appeared as Young Macduff in the RSC's production of Macbeth at the Barbican, alongside Christopher Eccleston and Niamh Cusack.

Filmography

Film

Television

References

External links

Living people
2006 births
English people of Sri Lankan Tamil descent
English Hindus
British male film actors
British male television actors
British male child actors
British male voice actors
21st-century British male actors
Year of birth uncertain